Next21 is a skyscraper, shopping and office complex in Niigata, Japan. It has become a landmark of Furumachi, one of the central business districts in Niigata.

Access
The Bandai-bashi Line BRT Furumachi bus stop (Stop No. 06) is in front of the building.

See also
 Bandai Bridge
 Toki Messe
 Niigata Nippo Media Ship

Office buildings completed in 1994
1994 establishments in Japan
Buildings and structures in Niigata (city)
Tourist attractions in Niigata Prefecture
Skyscraper office buildings in Japan
Retail buildings in Japan